The Team competition of the open water swimming events at the 2015 World Aquatics Championships was held on 30 July 2015. Each team consists of two men and one woman, who each race 5 km.

Results
The race was started at 12:00.

References

Team
World Aquatics Championships